Adolphe Ferrière (1879 in Geneva – 1960 in Geneva) was one of the founders of the progressive education movement.
He worked for a brief time in a school in Glarisegg (TG, CH) and later founded an experimental school ('La Forge') in Lausanne, Switzerland, but soon had to abandon teaching due to his deafness. In 1921, he founded the New Education Fellowship, for which he wrote the charter.  The congress of this league until the Second World War included a number of other teachers: Maria Montessori, Célestin Freinet, Gisèle de Failly and Roger Cousinet. He worked as a humanist and an editor from 1919 to 1922 on the pacifist journal 'l'Essor' (The Rise). In 1924, alongside his colleague Paul Meyhoffer from the Institut Jean-Jacques Rousseau, and the League of Nations officials Arthur Sweetser and Ludwik Rajchman, Ferrière founded the International School of Geneva (the first of its kind in the world) and, during the early months of its existence, provided the new school with accommodation in a chalet he owned. He was one of the founding members of the International Bureau of Education (IBE) in 1925, and served as its first Deputy Director alongside Elisabeth Rotten. He was also a member of the Religious Society of Friends (Quakers). Throughout his life he published a substantial number of books, some in collaboration with Karl-Ernst Krafft.

He is listed as one of the 100 most famous educators, by the International Bureau of Education (IBE).

Publications
Science and faith, Delachaux and Niestlé, Neuchâtel, 1912
The law of progress in biology and sociology, Delachaux and Niestlé, Neuchâtel, 1915
Transforming schools, Delachaux and Niestlé, Neuchâtel, 1920 (reprint 1948)
The autonomy of students, Delachaux and Niestlé, Neuchâtel, 1921 (reprint 1950)
The spontaneous activity in children, Delachaux and Niestlé, Neuchâtel, 1922
Education in the family, Delachaux and Niestlé, Neuchâtel, 1920
The practice of active school, Delachaux and Niestlé, Neuchâtel, 1922 (reprint 1929)
The active school, 1920 (reprint 1953)
The coééducation gender, Delachaux and Niestlé, Neuchâtel, 1926. (included in "Transforming Schools", 1948)
Spiritual progress, Delachaux and Niestlé, Neuchâtel, 1926
Bakula and his work educator, 1926
The maternal heart Pestalozzi, Delachaux and Niestlé, Neuchâtel, 1928
The psychological types in children, in adults and in the course of education, Delachaux and Niestlé, Neuchâtel, 1922
The future of genetic psychology, Delachaux and Niestlé, Neuchâtel, 1931
The school measure, Delachaux and Niestlé, Neuchâtel, 1931
Characterological typocosmique, Geneva and Paris, 1932.
In collaboration with Karl-Ernst Krafft
Our children and the future of the country, Delachaux and Niestlé, Neuchâtel, 1942
Human liberation, Éditions du Mont Blanc, Geneva, 1943
Towards a natural classification of psychological types, Nice, 1943
Children's Home after the war, Delachaux and Niestlé, Neuchâtel, 1945
The school workforce across Europe, Michon, Paris, 1948
Brief introduction to the new education, Bourrelier, Paris, 1951
The mystery of the person, Rigois, Turin, 1955

See also
Pedagogy

References

1879 births
1960 deaths
Swiss Quakers
People from Geneva
Academic staff of the University of Geneva